Bearcreek is an unincorporated community in Cedar County, in the U.S. state of Missouri.

History
A post office called Bear Creek was established in 1847, the name was changed to Bearcreek in 1894, and the post office closed in 1957. The community took its name from nearby Bear Creek.

References

Unincorporated communities in Cedar County, Missouri
Unincorporated communities in Missouri